Hazel Medina (October 8, 1937 – February 14, 2012) was a Panamanian-born American actress and social worker. She made many guest appearances on television shows between 1969 and 2007, as well as appearing on stage as a member of Theater West and a founding member of the Group Repertory Theater.

Career
She made her on-screen debut in the TV series I Spy in 1967, playing the younger sister of Bill Cosby's character. Then she followed up with a part in Gunsmoke. In 1970, she appeared in an episode of Medical Center, "The Rebel In White", playing the part of Hettie Simpson.

Illness and death
In 2007, Medina was diagnosed with Melanoma.  She died from complications of the disease on February 14, 2012. She was 74 years of age.

Filmography

References

External links

1938 births
2012 deaths
American television actresses
American film actresses
American social workers
Actresses from New York City
Actresses from Los Angeles
People from Colón District
Panamanian emigrants to the United States
Deaths from multiple myeloma
20th-century American actresses
21st-century American women